Pyle railway station is a minor station in Pyle in Bridgend county borough, south Wales. The station is located at street level at Beach Road in Pyle,  from London Paddington.

History

The original station at Pyle was opened by the South Wales Railway in 1850.

In the days of steam Pyle Junction, together with its extensive sidings, was quite an important strategic point on the South Wales railway system, not only for passengers, commuting from or visiting the resort of Porthcawl, but also for freight and bulk traffic, particularly the limestone from local quarries essential for the iron and steel industries. This is evidenced by the fact that during World War II there were two military 'pill-boxes' overlooking its approaches. This station was closed by the Western Region of British Railways in 1964 as part of the notorious Beeching cuts, less than a year after the L&O lines also lost their passenger service (traffic ceased on 9 September 1963, with complete closure following in February 1965).

For a time under British Rail direct trains ran to London Waterloo, now passengers have to change at Bridgend to reach London Paddington.

Facilities
The station has 2 platforms:
Platform 1, for westbound trains towards Swansea
Platform 2, for eastbound trains towards Cardiff Central

The station is unmanned - there is no ticket office nor are there any platform entry barriers. Passengers must purchase tickets on board trains.

Services
It is a stop on the South Wales Main Line, served by Transport for Wales' Swanline Swansea to Cardiff regional trains. These services are generally every two hours during the day (including Sundays), with additional trains during the morning and evening peaks (some of which continue beyond Swansea onto the West Wales Line).

References

External links

Railway stations in Bridgend County Borough
DfT Category F2 stations
Former Great Western Railway stations
Railway stations in Great Britain opened in 1850
Railway stations in Great Britain closed in 1963
Railway stations in Great Britain opened in 1994
South Wales Main Line
Railway stations served by Transport for Wales Rail
Beeching closures in Wales